A large goods vehicle (LGV), or heavy goods vehicle (HGV), in the European Union (EU) is any lorry with a gross combination mass (GCM) of over . The term medium goods vehicle is used within parts of the UK government to refer to goods vehicles of between 3,500 and 7,500 kg which according to the EU are also "large goods vehicles."

Commercial carrier vehicles of up to 3,500 kg are referred to as light commercial vehicles and come into category N1. Parts of the UK government also refer to these smaller vehicles as "large goods vehicles" (also abbreviated "LGV").

Driver licensing

European Union
It is necessary to have an appropriate European driving license to drive a large goods vehicle in the European Union. There are four categories:
This license can be obtained at 18 years of age and is the replacement for the HGV Class 3 in the UK (the old HGV Class 3 being any two-axle goods vehicle over 7,500 kg).
Category C1+E allows the holder to drive a large goods vehicle with a maximum authorized mass (gross vehicle weight) of up to 7,500 kg with a trailer over 750 kg maximum authorized mass, provided that the maximum authorized mass of the trailer does not exceed the unladen mass of the vehicle being driven, and provided that the combined maximum authorized mass of both the vehicle and trailer does not exceed .
Category C allows the holder to drive any large goods vehicle with a trailer having a maximum authorized mass of up to 750 kg. This is effectively the new GV Class 2 in the UK, the old HGV Class 2 being any rigid goods vehicle with more than two axles. A driver can commence training for a Category C license from 18 years old.
Category C+E: allows the holder to drive any large goods vehicle with a trailer having a maximum authorized mass of over 750 kg. This license could only be obtained after 6 months' experience with a Class 2 truck, but more recently the law has changed so that it is now possible to take the tests back-to-back (Category C first then C+E the following week). This is the new Class 1 licence.

Operator Licensing Operation of heavy goods vehicles for commercial reasons in European Union requires an operator's license. This allows member states to regulate companies operating these vehicles enforcing number of safety requirements which includes driver's hours regulations and vehicle safety standards.

UK
Drivers who passed a Category B (car) test before January 1, 1997 will have received Categories C1 and C1+E (Restriction Code 107: not more than ) through the Implied Rights issued by the Driver and Vehicle Licensing Agency (DVLA) (more commonly known as Grandfather Rights).

All UK LGV license holders must undergo a strict medical examination and eye test on application at age 45 and every 5 years thereafter. On reaching 65 years of age, a medical examination must be performed on an annual basis.

Canada
In the Canadian province of Ontario, drivers holding a Full Class AZ license can drive any truck/tractor trailer combination,
Drivers holding a Class B (school bus), C (regular bus) or D (heavy truck) license can drive a truck with a gross weight or registered gross weight exceeding  or any truck and trailer combination exceeding 11,000 kg gross weight or registered gross weight provided the towed vehicle is not over 4,600 kg.

New Zealand

There are four classes of heavy vehicle license: 2, 3, 4 and 5. Classes 1 and 6 are for light vehicles and motorcycles, respectively. The classes describe the characteristics of the vehicle, the weight limits, and the maximum number of axles.

Drivers must begin with a class 2 (medium rigid vehicle) learner license before progressing to a class 3 medium combination vehicle license or a class 4 heavy rigid vehicle license. A class 5 (heavy combination vehicle) license can only be earned after driving with a class 4 license for a specific timeframe (depending on age) or completing an accelerated course.

As New Zealand has a graduated driver licensing system, drivers must pass a theory test before being allowed to drive on the road. They can then drive with a supervisor for 6 months followed by a practical test, or they can complete an accelerated heavy vehicle course.

Safety
LGVs and their drivers are covered by strict regulations in many jurisdictions. For example, to improve safety, limit weight to that which will not excessively wear the transport infrastructure (roads, bridges, etc.).
The heavy weight of these vehicles leads to severe consequences for other road users in crashes; they are over-involved in fatal crashes, and in a 2013 study in London, were found to cause a disproportionate number of the annual casualty toll of cyclists.

Manufacturers
Current
 Daimler AG with subsidiaries
 BharatBenz
 Mercedes-Benz
 Freightliner
 Mitsubishi Fuso
 Western Star
 Paccar with subsidiaries
 DAF
 Kenworth
 Leyland Trucks
 Peterbilt
 Traton Group with subsidiaries
 MAN Truck & Bus
 Navistar International
 Scania Trucks & Buses
 Volkswagen Caminhões e Ônibus
 Volvo Group with subsidiaries
 Dongfeng Commercial Vehicles (45%)
 Mack Trucks 
 Renault Trucks 
 UD Trucks
 Volvo Trucks
 Hyundai

Ordinary goods vehicle
In the United Kingdom, the related term Ordinary Goods Vehicle (OGV) is used for medium and large goods vehicles. The Department for Transport COBA 7 scheme divides this into OGV1 (with up to three axles) and OGV2 (with four or more axles).

See also

Commercial vehicle
Light commercial vehicle
Light truck
Longer Heavier Vehicle

References

External links
Lorry sizes and weights UK House of Commons briefing paper
Weights and dimensions / vehicle plating
The different sizes of lorries and weights in the UK
88/77/EEC of 3 December 1987 on the approximation of the laws of the Member States relating to the measures to be taken against the emission of gaseous pollutants from diesel engines for use in vehicles EUR-Lex, European Union law Web site
Ontario Ministry of Transportation, Licence Types

Trucks